Holy Spirit Hospital is a Charitable Trust Hospital located in Andheri, Mumbai, owned and managed by the Missionary Sisters Servants of the Holy Spirit, which began in 1964 as an out-patient clinic.

History
In 1964, four nuns from the Netherlands-based Missionary Sisters Servants of the Holy Spirit established an outpatient medication dispensary under a tree in Andheri. By 1967 they had developed a 65-bed hospital which eventually grew to a comprehensive 300-bed facility. Later, a dirt track path between the Mahakali Caves and the hospital was replaced by a road extension from Chakala. BEST provided a twice-daily bus service at the hospital's request. One nun of the hospital's order, Sister Hermanelde, received the Cross of the Order of Merit.,

Notable patients
 Roomel D'Souza: U-17 Maharashtra Hockey Player, had undergone surgery to treat bilateral hallux valgus, she was treated by Dr. Nicholas Antao
 Archbishop of Cuttack-Bhubaneswar Emeritus Mar Raphael Cheenath, was being treated for ill health. He died on 14 August 2016.
 Actor Nirmal Pandey, died following a cardiac arrest. He died at Mumbai's Holy Spirit hospital on 18 February 2010.
 Ashok Walam, protest panel head against Konkan oil refinery, who was admitted due to the chest pain and pressure which he was facing from the officers over the refinery issue.
 First air-born baby on board an Indian airline, Jetson Jose, born on board the Jet Airways Dammam-Kochi flight on 18 June 2017, and rushed to Holy Spirit hospital after the aircraft was diverted to Mumbai.
 Spanish Jesuit priest Father Federico Gussi Sopena, was in critical condition and was undergoing treatment.

References

Hospitals in Mumbai
Charitable hospitals
Hospitals established in 1964
1994 establishments in Maharashtra